"Poison" is a song by American singer Aaliyah featuring Canadian singer the Weeknd. It was released on December 17, 2021, through Blackground Records 2.0, as the lead single from Aaliyah's upcoming posthumous studio album, Unstoppable. The Weeknd wrote the song alongside Belly and Aaliyah's frequent collaborator, Static Major. Production was handled by DannyBoyStyles and Nick Lamb with engineer Mike Dean.

Background
In August 2021, it was reported that Aaliyah's recorded work for Blackground (since rebranded as Blackground Records 2.0) would be re-released on physical, digital, and (for the first time ever) streaming services in a deal between the label and Empire Distribution, beginning with One in a Million on August 20, 2021. On August 25, 2021, Aaliyah's uncle and Blackground Records 2.0 label boss, Barry Hankerson, revealed in an interview with Big Tigger for WVEE that a fourth (and likely final) studio album, titled Unstoppable, would be released in "a matter of weeks". The album will feature Drake, Snoop Dogg, Ne-Yo, Chris Brown, Future and use previously unreleased vocals from before Aaliyah's passing. Hankerson shared that this will be the end of new music for the late star and added, "I think it's wonderful. It's a very emotional process to do. It's very difficult to hear her sing when she's not here, but we got through it." 

On "Poison", Aaliyah's vocals had been demoed in 2001, shortly before the singer's untimely death. Hankerson issued a statement, "Thank you to all of her many fans for keeping [Aaliyah's] music alive. I'm sorry it took so long, but when you lose a family member so unexpectedly, it takes time to deal with that type of grief. I decided to release Aaliyah's music in order to keep her legacy alive."

Controversy
Upon release, the single attracted backlash due to the poor quality of Aaliyah's vocals in comparison to the crisp quality of the Weeknd's vocals. Fans of Aaliyah dismissed the song as "disrespectful".  Less than twenty four hours after release, Mike Dean, who mixed and mastered the track, released an updated version on all digital outlets.

Chart performance
One week after the single's release, it debuted at number 33 on the New Zealand Hot Singles Chart.

In the US, "Poison" peaked at number 21 on the Billboard Adult R&B Airplay Chart and spent twelve weeks on that chart. It also debuted on the Billboard R&B Digital Song Sales at number 14 and the Hot R&B Songs chart at number 15.

Critical reception
D-Money for Soul Bounce wrote, "there's something a bit off about the song. In particular, Aaliyah's vocals, which are poorly mixed and sound filtered through an old computer." Jon Blistein, writing for Rolling Stone, called the single "tender".

Charts

Release history

References

External links
 

2021 singles
Songs written by the Weeknd
Songs written by Belly (rapper)
Songs written by Static Major
Aaliyah songs
The Weeknd songs
Songs released posthumously
Male–female vocal duets
2021 songs
Blackground Records singles